Gravitasjon is a musical album, released by the DumDum Boys in 2006. "Enhjørning" was the first single from the album.

Track listing

 "Lunta brenner"
 "Gå på vannet"
 "Tynn tråd"
 "Enhjørning"
 "Gravitasjon"
 "Takke faen"
 "Brillefin"
 "TipTop"
 "Stengetid"
 "Seig jævel"
 "Waltzheimer"

Charts

References

DumDum Boys albums
2006 albums